Devendra Satyarthi (28 May 1908 – 2003) was an Indian folklorist and writer of Hindi, Urdu, Punjabi literature. Born at Bhaduar (Barnala) he did not complete his education and started travelling from 1927 collecting folk songs which he published in his first folk song anthology in 1935 under the name Giddha, which is considered by many as a seminal work.

Satyarthi published over 50 books composed of novels, short stories, poems, essays and folksong anthologies in Urdu, Hindi and Punjabi languages, but reportedly on advice from Rabindranath Tagore, he wrote mostly in Punjabi language towards the end. Mere Saakshatkaar, Miss Folklore, Meet My People - Indian Folk Poetry, Pañjābī loka-sāhita wica sainika, Lanka Desa hai Kolambu, Brahmaputra, and Rath ke Pahiye are some of his notable works.

A winner of the Hindi Sahitya Sadhna Samman, Satyarthi was awarded the fourth highest Indian civilian award of Padma Shri by the Government of India in 1977. He died on 12 February 2003, at the age of 94, succumbing to old age illnesses. Pancham, a monthly magazine published from Lahore, brought out a 300-page special issue on him in April 2003 and his life has been documented in a biography, Satyarthi – Ik Dant-katha, written by Nirmal Arpan.

See also

 Folklore of India

References

Recipients of the Padma Shri in literature & education
1908 births
2003 deaths
People from Sangrur
Punjabi people
Indian folklorists
Indian male novelists
Indian male essayists
Indian male short story writers
20th-century Indian novelists
20th-century Indian essayists
20th-century Indian short story writers
Writers from Punjab, India
20th-century Indian male writers